The Springfield Bridge is a historic bowstring truss bridge, located in Beaverfork Lake Park in Conway, Arkansas, USA. It originally spanned Cadron Creek in rural Faulkner County east of Springfield. Built circa 1871–74, it is the oldest documented highway bridge in the state and its only documented bowstring arch bridge.

The bridge was listed on the National Register of Historic Places in 1988. In 2015, the Faulkner County Historical Society began a drive to relocate the bridge as part of a local trail network. The bridge has suffered from neglect due to its remote location as well as damage by fire and vandalism. The bridge was moved to its present location in 2017.

See also
List of bridges documented by the Historic American Engineering Record in Arkansas
List of bridges on the National Register of Historic Places in Arkansas
National Register of Historic Places listings in Faulkner County, Arkansas

References

External links

Road bridges on the National Register of Historic Places in Arkansas
Bridges completed in 1871
Historic American Engineering Record in Arkansas
Bowstring truss bridges in the United States
Metal bridges in the United States
1871 establishments in Arkansas
Transportation in Faulkner County, Arkansas
Relocated buildings and structures in Arkansas
Pedestrian bridges in the United States